Ludwig (Ljudevit) Mitterpacher von Mitterburg (1734, Bilje – 1814) was a Hungarian agronomist, botanist, zoologist and entomologist.
 
Mitterpacher was a professor of natural history in Budapest working with fellow professor Matthias Piller (1733–1788). 
He wrote Elementa Rei Rusticae in Usum Academiarum Regni Hungariae Budae: Typis Regiae Universitatis, Anno MDCCLXXIX and M. DCC. XCIV( 1779 and 1794), a study of the theory and practice of agricultural science.
and in 1783 with Matthias Piller Iter per Poseganam Sclavoniaeprovinciam mensibus Junio, et Julio Anno MDCCLXXXII susceptum. Regiae Universitatis, Budapest, a 147-page work with 16 plates in which they described new species of Coleoptera and Lepidoptera.

Works 
 Kurzgefasste Naturgeschichte der Erdkugel : zum Behufe der Vorlesungen in der k.k. theresianischen Akademie. 1774
 Anfangsgründe der physikalischen Astronomie. 1776
 Elementa rei rusticae. 1779
 Physikalische Erdbeschreibung. 1789

References 

Horn and Schenkling 1928-1929.Index Litteratuae Entomologicae Horn, Berlin-Dahlem.

1734 births
1814 deaths
Hungarian entomologists
19th-century Hungarian zoologists
19th-century Hungarian botanists
Hungarian agronomists
18th-century Hungarian botanists
18th-century Hungarian zoologists